Government Printing Office Workers is a series of three relief sculptures, located at the Government Printing Office Building, North Capitol Street, and G Street, Northeast, Washington, D.C.

Design
The panels are installed on the third floor of the north side of the building. The left panel shows a standing figure operating a printing press, with rollers, and the right panel shows a standing male figure unloading rolls of paper. They are by Elliott Means. The center panel shows an eagle surmounting the Government Printing Office seal, and is by Armin A. Scheler.

See also
 List of public art in Washington, D.C., Ward 6

References

External links
http://www.dcmemorials.com/index_indiv0000069.htm

Landmarks in Washington, D.C.
Outdoor sculptures in Washington, D.C.
1937 sculptures
1937 establishments in Washington, D.C.
Stone sculptures in Washington, D.C.